Darwinian anthropology describes an approach to anthropological analysis which employs various theories from Darwinian evolutionary biology. Whilst there are a number of areas of research that can come under this broad description (Marks, 2004) some specific research projects have been closely associated with the label. A prominent example is the project that developed in the mid 1970s with the goal of applying sociobiological perspectives to explain patterns of human social relationships, particularly kinship patterns across human cultures.

This kinship-focused Darwinian anthropology was a significant intellectual forebear of evolutionary psychology, and both draw on biological theories of the evolution of social behavior (in particular inclusive fitness theory) upon which the field of sociobiology was founded.

Overview

In 1974 the biologist Richard D. Alexander published an article The Evolution of Social Behavior which drew upon W.D.Hamilton's work on inclusive fitness and kin selection and noted that:

Amongst other suggestions, Alexander suggested that certain patterns of social cooperation documented by ethnographers, in particular the avunculate ('mother's brother') relationship, could be explained in reference to individuals pursuing a strategy of individual inclusive fitness maximization under conditions of low certainty-of-paternity. This hypothesis was subsequently taken up and elaborated in a series of studies by other Darwinian anthropologists:

Ultimately these analyses were considered unsuccessful, and were specifically criticized by other sociobiologists on a number of grounds. One problem was said to be that interpreting inclusive fitness theory to imply that individuals have evolved the characteristic of pursuing strategies to maximize their own 'inclusive fitness' is erroneous; the theory should instead be interpreted to describe selection pressures on genes:

A related problem was that, in assuming that individuals simply operate as inclusive fitness maximizing agents, any investigation of the proximate psychological mechanisms that mediate social behaviors was ignored. Symons made this observation in his 1989 Critique of Darwinian Anthropology:

Symons, along with Tooby and Cosmides, were amongst the founders of the emerging school of evolutionary psychology, whose aim has been to focus more on these hypothesized proximate psychological mechanisms.

Theoretical background

Darwinian anthropology was critiqued by Symonds for its agnosticism as to the psychological mechanisms governing how social behavior is actually expressed in the human species, and its reliance on interpreting inclusive fitness theory to simply imply that humans have evolved to be inclusive fitness maximizers. This section will review some of the relevant background discussion in inclusive fitness theory to clarify why this position was considered untenable.

Evolutionary  versus proximate explanations

Inclusive Fitness theory has often been interpreted to mean that social behavior per se is a goal of evolution, and also that  genes (or individual organisms) are selected to find ways of actively distinguishing the identity of close genetic relatives ‘in order to’ engage in social behaviors with them.

The apparent rationale for this common mis-interpretation is that organisms  would thereby benefit  the  “Inclusive  Fitness  of  the  individuals  (and  genes) involved”.  This approach  overlooks the point that evolution is not a teleological process, but  a  passive, consequential  and  undirected biological process, where environmental variations and drift effects are present alongside random gene mutations and natural selection.

Inclusive fitness theory takes the form of an ultimate explanation, specifically a criterion (br>c), for the evolution of social behaviors, not a proximate mechanism governing the expression of social behaviors. What forms of social behavior might meet this criterion are cannot be a priori specified by the theory, nor can it shed light on whether the life history of a species provides opportunities for social interactions to occur. Thus, strictly speaking, the interpretation that organisms ‘have evolved to’ direct social behavior towards genetic relatives is not implied by the theory (see also inclusive fitness).

Investigating how inclusive fitness theory might apply to the potential emergence of social traits in any  given  species  must begin  with  an  analysis  of  the evolutionarily  typical ecological niche, demographics, and patterns of interaction of that species. Where significant interaction between individuals is not present in the life history of a species, the theory is necessarily null regarding social behaviors between individuals. As Silk (2001) put it;

Consideration  must thus be given to whether the ecological niche leads to the clustering of individuals in groups or whether individuals are typically solitary. Socioecology research, for example, suggests that fundamental influences on demographic patterns are the distribution/fecundity of primary food sources as well as patterns of predation. When considering social behavior traits of a given species, consideration of these influences is in a sense, logically prior to analyses of inclusive fitness pressures on the species.

Selection pressure on genes or strategy of individuals

Darwinian anthropology, following R. D. Alexander, used the notion of the inclusive fitness of individuals rather than the inclusive fitness of genes. Dawkins (above) pointed to this as an error. The source of the confusion can be traced to discussions in Hamilton's early papers on inclusive fitness. In his 1963 paper Hamilton refers, unambiguously, to selection pressures on genes;

However, in his paper published in 1964, actually written before the 1963 paper (Hamilton 1996), Hamilton had included a subsidiary discussion on what the genetic theory might imply for how we look at the fitness of individuals:

It is clear here that the formal treatment is of the selection pressures on types (genes or traits), whilst the notion of individual inclusive fitness may serve as a guide to the adaptiveness of the trait; just as consideration of effects of a trait on an individual's fitness can be instructive when considering classical selection on traits. At the same time, it is understandable that Alexander took the inclusive fitness of individuals as a heuristic device.

Context-based or discrimination-based expression mechanisms

In his 1964 paper, Hamilton 'hazards' “the  following  unrigorous  statement  of  the  main  principle  that  has emerged from the model”;

He uses the terms 'hazards', 'unrigorous', and 'will seem' deliberately, since his formal analysis makes clear that the model specifies the evolutionary selection pressure, rather than specifying what mechanisms govern the proximate expression of social behaviors. He also clearly points to social behaviors being evoked in distinct situations, and that individuals may encounter potential social recipients of different degree of relationship in different situations. If one ignores the cautious qualifying words however, the passage might readily be interpreted to imply that individuals are indeed expected to make an active assessment of the degree of relatedness of others they interact with in different situations. Later in the paper, Hamilton again discusses the issue of whether the performance (or expression) of social behaviors might be conditional on; (a) discriminating factors which correlate with close relationship with the recipient, or (b) actually discriminating which individuals 'really are' in close relationship with the recipient:

For certain social behaviors, Hamilton suggests there may be selection pressure for more discerning discrimination of genetic relatedness, were the mutation to occur. But 'in fact' the same net result of accurately targeting social behaviors towards genetic relatives could be achieved via a simpler mechanism of being expressed in proximity to the actor's 'home'. Hamilton is thus agnostic as to whether evolved social behaviors might be expressed via straightforward proximate mechanisms such as location-based cues, or whether more specific discriminatory powers might govern their expression. He does suggest that the distinct social contexts within which various social behaviors are expressed are factors to consider. Other theorists have discussed these questions of whether proximity, context or more discriminatory expression may govern behaviors:

Dawkins believes social behaviors will in practice be governed by context-based expression. Maynard Smith is, like Hamilton, agnostic, but reiterates the point that context-based cues might well govern their expression and that actively distinguishing relatives is not necessarily expected for the expression of those social traits whose evolution is governed by inclusive fitness criteria. In sum, inclusive fitness theory does imply that; the evolutionary emergence of social behavior can occur where there is statistical association of genes between social actors and recipients; but that the expression of such evolved social behaviors is not necessarily governed by actual genetic relatedness between participants. The evolutionary criterion and the proximate mechanism must thus not be confused: the first does require genetic association (of the form br>c), the second does not.

Darwinian anthropology's central premise that human behavior has evolved to maximize the inclusive fitness of individuals is thus not a logical derivative of the theory. Also, the notion that humans will discriminate social behaviors towards genetic relatives is again not entailed by the theory.

Reception by anthropologists

Before the questions raised within anthropology about the study of ‘kinship’ by Schneider  and others from the 1960s onwards, anthropology itself had paid very little attention to the  notion that social bonds were anything other than connected to consanguinal (or genetic) relatedness (or its local cultural conceptions).  The social bonding associated  with  provision  of and sharing of food was one important exception, particularly in the work of Richards, but this was largely ignored by descriptions of ‘kinship’ till more recently.  Although questioning the means by which ‘kinship bonds’ form, few of these early accounts questioned the fundamental role of ‘procreative ties’ in social bonding (Schneider, 1984). From the 1950s onwards, reports on kinship patterns in the New Guinea Highlands added some momentum to what had until then been only occasional fleeting suggestions that living together (co-residence) might underlie social bonding, and eventually contributed to the general shift away from a genealogical approach. For example, on the basis of his observations, Barnes suggested:

Similarly, Langness' ethnography of the Bena Bena also emphasized a break with the genealogical perspective:

By 1972, Schneider had raised deep problems with the notion that human social bonds and 'kinship' was a natural category built upon genealogical ties (for more information, see kinship), and especially in the wake of his 1984 critique this has become broadly accepted by most, if not all, anthropologists.

The darwinian anthropology (and other sociobiological) perspectives, arising in the early 1970s, had not unreasonably assumed that the genealogical conceptions of human kinship, in place since Morgan's early work in the 1870s, were still valid as a universal feature of humans. But they emerged at precisely the time that anthropology, being particularly sensitive about its own apparent 'ethnocentric' generalizations about kinship (from cultural particulars to human universals) was seeking to distance itself from these conceptions. The vehemence of Sahlins' rebuttal of sociobiology's genetic relatedness perspective in his 1976 The use and abuse of Biology, which underlined the non-genealogical nature of human kinship, can be understood as part of this 'distancing' trend.

Alternative approaches

The lack of success of darwinian anthropology created space for alternative approaches to analyzing human social behaviors from a biological perspective. Alexander's initial point (above) that the inclusive fitness framework had been scarcely applied to human kinship and social patterns has remained largely valid. But the move away from genealogical kinship in anthropology has continued to be a major barrier to any potential resolution. This section reviews a range of approaches to synthesizing ideas from  evolutionary biology to observations and data about human social behaviour across contemporary human populations. Whilst some of these approaches include the inclusive fitness approach, others may seek to demonstrate fit to other theories from evolutionary biology, or to demonstrate that certain proximate mechanisms of social behaviour are both compatible with the inclusive fitness approach, and also with the broad variety of ethnographic data on human kinship patterns.

Evolutionary psychology

Human behavioural ecology

Nurture kinship

Criticism

Theories in evolutionary biology relevant to understanding social behavior may not be limited to frameworks such as inclusive fitness theory. The theory of reciprocal altruism may have equal or greater explanatory power for some forms of human social behavior, and perhaps kinship patterns. Other approaches may maintain that human behavior is less amenable to biological analysis due to the prominent influence of social learning and cultural transmission in the human species, and instead advance ideas based on the role of e.g. culture, historical contingencies or economic/environmental conditions. All or any of these may or may not contribute valuable insights to our understanding of social behavior and social patterns in humans.

See also
 Kinship
 Anthropology
 Nurture kinship
 Avunculate
 Inclusive fitness
 Kin selection
 Evolutionary psychology
 Human behavioral ecology
 Selfish gene theory

References 

Evolutionary biology
Anthropology